Winners of The Deadlys Awards 1999, the awards were an annual celebration of Australian Aboriginal and Torres Strait Islander achievement in music, sport, entertainment and community.

Music
Excellence in Film or Theatrical Score: Tiddas & Alister Jones: My Island Home
Outstanding Contribution to Aboriginal Music: Coloured Stone
Most Promising New Talent: Rochelle Watson
Male Artist of the Year: Jimmy Little
Female Artist of the Year: Leah Purcell
Album Release of the Year: Frank Yamma & Piranpa: Playing with Fire
Band of the Year: Yothu Yindi
Single Release of the Year: Jimmy Little: "The Way You Make Me Feel"

Community
Aboriginal Broadcaster of the Year: Rehanna Coulthard 5UMA

External links
 

The Deadly Awards
1999 music awards
1999 in Australian music
Indigenous Australia-related lists